Olympic Moustakbel d’Arzew, known as OM Arzew or simply OMA for short, is an Algerian football club based in Arzew. The club was founded in 1947 and its colors are blue and white. Their home stadium, the Menaouer Kerbouci Stadium, has a capacity of some 7,000 spectators. The club is currently playing in the Algerian Ligue 2 after they won the 2018-19 Amateur League West.

Current squad

References

External links
 LNF Profile

 
Association football clubs established in 1946
Oran Province
1947 establishments in Algeria
Sports clubs in Algeria